Sankt Olof is a locality situated in Simrishamn Municipality, Skåne County, Sweden with 624 inhabitants in 2010.

Sankt Olof is a village located 15 miles northwest of Simrishamn. The village is named after the church, which in its turn is named after Olaf II of Norway, the village was originally called Lunkende.

References

External links 
 Sankt Olofs Byalag

Populated places in Skåne County
Populated places in Simrishamn Municipality